The Sudanese national basketball team is the national team of the country of Sudan. It is administered by the Sudan Basketball Association.

In the 1960s and 1970s, the country was among the continent's basketball elite as it finished runner-up at the FIBA Africa Championship in 1962 and won bronze in 1975. 

The country has produced some NBA players, most notably Manute Bol and Luol Deng of the Minnesota Timberwolves. Deng, however, is not eligible for the national team, as he has been naturalized in the United Kingdom and plays for the UK in FIBA competitions and England in the Commonwealth Games. Traditionally, most of Sudan's most talented players have usually come from the South. (Bol and Deng e.g. were both born in South Sudan) Hence, the independence of South Sudan brought forth new challenges. 

In recent years, several of the Sudan's top players have played key roles for teams of the US-based NCAA. Yet, these players normally do not play for the national team. Hence, the level of the national team has been very low. It finished winless at both the 2005 Islamic Solidarity Games and the 2011 Pan Arab Games.

Competitive record

Summer Olympics
yet to qualify

World championships
yet to qualify

African Championship

African Games

yet to qualify

Current squad
At 2011 Pan Arab Games:  (last publicized squad)

At the 2011 Pan Arab Games, Kamal Elfadel was Sudan's dominant player as he averaged 22 points and 11 rebounds per game.

Notable players
Current notable players from Sudan:

See also
Sudan national under-19 basketball team

References

External links
Sudan Men National Team 2011 at Afrobasket.com
Sudan Basketball Records at FIBA Archive

Sudan
Basketball
Basketball teams in Sudan
1953 establishments in Sudan
Basketball